Mirror Image is a novel by Danielle Steel about identical twins Victoria and Olivia Henderson, set during the First World War.

Plot summary
When Victoria's reputation is seriously at risk the only way to retrieve it is by marrying the handsome lawyer Charles Dawson, who also works with the girls' father, Edward Henderson. Olivia is inclined to stay and help their father, who is ill, but Victoria needs her the most when her marriage seems to be failing. It is not helped by Charles's 10-year-old son, Geoffrey, who is still distraught after losing his mother Susan, Charles' first wife, on the Titanic.

When Victoria proposes an unthinkable plan, Olivia is forced to accept, leaving her with a marriage she never thought she could have and her sister going off to help in France, when World War I is in full throttle.

1998 American novels
Novels set during World War I
Novels by Danielle Steel
Delacorte Press books
American romance novels